Kokosbrood [Dutch] literally Coconut Bread, is a sandwich topping made of coconut meat which is dried, shredded, and pressed into a loaf mould. Wheat starch and glucose are added to the coconut mix and the loaf. Now sold in pre-sliced packets, traditionally local corner stores would sell slices cut to order from the whole loaf.
 It is a popular breakfast food of the Netherlands, due to its colonial history, and is produced with various flavours including chocolate and raspberry.

References

External links 

 kokosbrood.nl/ - Website of one of the manufacturers, Theunisse.

Sliced foods
Coconuts